Michael Belkin is an Israeli academic and researcher working in ophthalmology, Professor Emeritus of Ophthalmology at Tel Aviv University. His research brought about advances in glaucoma treatment such as the ExPress glaucoma implant, the Ioptimate  laser glaucoma surgery and a fast, non-contact glaucoma laser treatment.

He established and was the inaugural director of the Tel Aviv University Eye Research Institute, located at the Sheba Medical Center.

Education
Belkin completed a master's degree in natural sciences from the University of Cambridge, and a doctorate in medicine from the Hebrew University of Jerusalem.

Career
Belkin served as head of the Research, Development and Non-Conventional Warfare Medicine department of the Israel Defence Forces Medical Corps for three years. During that time, he development military goggles to protect the eyes of soldiers.

He also publicized the threat of laser radiation to the eye and endeavoured to develop treatment for laser-induced eye injuries.

Belkin is a Senior Scientific Advisor to the Singapore National Eye Centre. [18] Belkin founded Belkin Laser Ltd. in 2013 and served as the company's Chief Medical Officer. He serves on the board and scientific advisory board of various companies engaged in developing novel ophthalmic technologies.

Belkin has been a voting member of SPIE, the International Society for Optics and Photonics for 11 years, and serves on the organization's Conference Program Committee.

Developments in ophthalmologic technology

Belkin developed the novel External Automatic Glaucoma Laser (EAGLE), a Direct Selective Trabeculoplasty (DSLT) device to change conventional glaucoma management from a specialized procedure to a procedure which general ophthalmologists can perform. Belkin's company BELKIN Laser Ltd was part of a multidisciplinary, multinational consortium that successfully received EU funding of 2480275 Euros in 2016. Under the project title GLAUrious this consortium aimed to ease commercialization of the EAGLE technology and drive adoption by general ophthalmologists.

Sheba Medical Centre carried out the first-in Human Clinical trials of the EAGLE. Their results found that their automated DSLT is a safe and effective method for reducing intraocular pressure.

GLAUrious began clinical trials in Italy at the University of Genoa and in the UK at Queens University Belfast and Moorfields Eyes Hospital, London in 2018. In 1998, he developed a novel miniature glaucoma shunt, named ex-PRESS. The implant is commonly used in glaucoma surgery. He was involved in developing and clinically proving a method to treat adult amblyopia (lazy eye), an achievement which was previously considered impossible. He also invented methods of automatic measuring visual function in children and binocular treatment of amblyopia.

Belkin is named as inventor or co-inventor on 16 patents registered in the United States and as inventor or applicant on 30 patents globally.

Research and findings

Belkin identified a correlation between the development of myopia and years of schooling and intelligence in a substantial male population aged 17–19.

He was one of the first to prove that reducing visual acuity in the elderly, mostly due to improperly fitted or non-use of eyeglasses is associated with reduced cognitive functions.

Belkin was part of the team investigating the implantation of pre-treated macrophages into rats stimulated tissue repair. This procedure was later extended to human trials for spinal injury patients and established that humans could tolerate the procedure. He was one of the first to use stem cells in vascular and ophthalmic diseases clinically.

Belkin was part of a team researching the link between cigarette smoking and ocular disease, both through tobacco and exposure to passive smoke.

Selected publications

References

Living people
Israeli ophthalmologists
Year of birth missing (living people)
Academic staff of Tel Aviv University
Hebrew University of Jerusalem alumni
Alumni of the University of Cambridge